The 2014–15 USC Upstate Spartans men's basketball team represented the University of South Carolina Upstate during the 2014–15 NCAA Division I men's basketball season. The Spartans, led by 13th year head coach Eddie Payne, played their home games at the G. B. Hodge Center and were members of the Atlantic Sun Conference. They finished the season 24–11, 8–6 in A-Sun play to finish in third place. They advanced to the championship game of the A-Sun tournament where they lost to North Florida. They were invited to the CollegeInsider.com Tournament where they defeated James Madison in the first round before losing in the second round to UT Martin.

Roster

Schedule

|-
!colspan=9 style="background:#085435; color:#FFFFFF;"| Regular season

|-
!colspan=9 style="background:#085435; color:#FFFFFF;"| Atlantic Sun tournament

|-
!colspan=9 style="background:#085435; color:#FFFFFF;"| CIT

References

USC Upstate Spartans men's basketball seasons
USC Upstate
USC Upstate
Charleston Southern Buc South Carolina
USC Upstate Spartans men's basketball